Merkel cells, also known as Merkel-Ranvier cells or tactile epithelial cells, are oval-shaped mechanoreceptors essential for light touch sensation and found in the skin of vertebrates. They are abundant in highly sensitive skin like that of the fingertips in humans, and make synaptic contacts with somatosensory afferent nerve fibers. It has been reported that Merkel cells are derived from neural crest cells, though more recent experiments in mammals have indicated that they are epithelial in origin.

Structure

Merkel cells are found in the skin and some parts of the mucosa of all vertebrates. In mammalian skin, they are clear cells found in the stratum basale (at the bottom of sweat duct ridges) of the epidermis approximately 10 μm in diameter. They are oval-shaped mechanoreceptors essential for light touch sensation and found in the skin of vertebrates. They are abundant in highly sensitive skin like that of the fingertips in humans, and make synaptic contacts with somatosensory afferent nerve fibers. They also occur in epidermal invaginations of the plantar foot surface called rete ridges.

Most often, they are associated with sensory nerve endings, when they are known as Merkel nerve endings (also called a Merkel cell-neurite complex). They are associated with slowly adapting (SA1) somatosensory nerve fibers. They react to low vibrations (5–15 Hz) and deep static touch such as shapes and edges. Due to a small receptive field (extremely detailed info) they are densely present in areas like fingertips; they are not covered (shelled) and thus respond to pressures over long periods.

Developmental
The origin of Merkel cells has been debated for over 20 years. Evidence from skin graft experiments in birds implies that they are neural crest derived, but experiments in mammals now demonstrate an epidermal origin.

Function
The German anatomist Friedrich Sigmund Merkel referred to these cells as Tastzellen or "touch cells" but this proposed function has been controversial as it has been hard to prove. Though,  genetic knockout mice have recently shown that Merkel cells are essential for the specialized coding by which afferent nerves resolve fine spatial details. Merkel cells are sometimes considered APUD cells (an older definition. More commonly classified as a part of dispersed neuroendocrine system) because they contain dense core granules, and thus may also have a neuroendocrine function.

Subject to malignancy
Although uncommon, these cells may become malignant and form a Merkel cell carcinoma—an aggressive and difficult to treat skin cancer.

See also 
 Merkel nerve ending
 Merkel cell carcinoma
 List of keratins expressed in the human integumentary system
 List of human cell types derived from the germ layers

References

External links

 
 NIF Search - Merckel Disc Cell via the Neuroscience Information Framework

Nervous tissue cells
Skin anatomy